is a railway station in Kōtō, Tokyo, Japan. Its station number is S-15. The station opened on December 21, 1978.

Platforms
Ojima Station consists of two island platforms served by three tracks.

Surrounding area
The station is located underneath Tokyo Metropolitan Route 50 (Shin-Ōhashi-dōri) near its intersection with Tokyo Metropolitan Route 476 (Kyūhachi-dōri). The Shuto Expressway's No. 7 Komatsugawa Line is half a kilometer to the north. The area is a mix of commercial, residential, and light industrial.

Connecting bus service
Toei Bus: Ōjima-Ekimae
 Kusa 24: for Asakusa-Kotobukichō
 Kame 24: for Kasaibashi; via Nishi-Ōjima Station for Kameido Station
 Kame 21: for Tōyōchō Station; via Suijinmori for Kameido Station

References

External links

 Tokyo Metropolitan Bureau of Transportation: Ojima Station

Railway stations in Japan opened in 1978
Railway stations in Tokyo